Liz Miles (born January 25, 1955) is an American rower. She competed in the women's coxed four event at the 1984 Summer Olympics.

References

External links
 

1955 births
Living people
American female rowers
Olympic rowers of the United States
Rowers at the 1984 Summer Olympics
Sportspeople from Fresno, California
21st-century American women